Charleston Outlaws Rugby Football Club is a rugby union team based in Charleston, South Carolina. The Outlaws compete in Division II Carolina's GU. Charleston has hosted an annual rugby sevens tournament on Memorial Day Weekend since 2003.

Results 

2013 D2 Results:

Playoffs

References

External links
Official Site
Palmetto Rugby Union
Rugby South
USA Rugby

Rugby union teams in South Carolina